Wilfrid Laurier McDougald (August 9, 1881 – June 19, 1942) was a Canadian senator.

Born in Alexandria, Ontario, he was educated at McGill University (where he was a member of The Kappa Alpha Society) and Queen's University and practiced medicine in Montreal. He was appointed Chairman of the Montreal Harbour Commission in 1922.

In 1926, he was appointed to the Senate representing the senatorial division of Wellington, Quebec. He resigned in 1932 as a result of the Beauharnois Scandal.

He built Northbrook Lodge at Paul Smiths, New York between about 1919 and 1922. It was listed on the U.S. National Register of Historic Places in 2014.

Archives 
There is a Wilfrid Laurier McDougald fonds at Library and Archives Canada.

References

External links
 
Senator McDougald involved in building the Jacques Cartier Bridge in Montreal

1881 births
1942 deaths
Canadian senators from Quebec
Liberal Party of Canada senators
People from the United Counties of Stormont, Dundas and Glengarry
McGill University alumni